John William Harreld (January 24, 1872December 26, 1950) was a United States representative and Senator from Oklahoma. Harreld was the first Republican senator elected in Oklahoma and represented a shift in Oklahoma politics.

Early life and career
Harreld was born in Butler County, Kentucky near Morgantown to Martha Helm and Thomas Nelson Harreld. He attended public schools, the normal school at Lebanon, Ohio, and Bryant & Stratton Business College of Louisville, Kentucky, where he taught while studying law. Admitted to the bar in 1889, he begin his practice in Morgantown. He was prosecuting attorney of Butler County from 1892 to 1896. After marrying Laura Ward on October 20, 1889, and having a son, Ward, he moved to Ardmore, Oklahoma in 1906. He was a referee in bankruptcy from 1908 to 1915, when he resigned to become an executive with an oil corporation. He moved to Oklahoma City in 1917 and engaged in the production of oil and continued the practice of law. After his first wife's death, he married his wife's sister, Thurlow Ward, in 1931.

Political career
Harreld was elected, on November 8, 1919, as a Republican to the Sixty-sixth Congress to fill the vacancy caused by the death of Joseph B. Thompson and served from November 8, 1919, to March 4, 1921. He was not a candidate for renomination, having become a candidate for the Republican nomination for U.S. Senator; he was elected to the Senate in 1920 and served from March 4, 1921, to March 4, 1927; he was an unsuccessful candidate for reelection in 1926. He served as Senate chairman of the Committee on Indian Affairs. He was an unsuccessful candidate for election in 1940 to the Seventy-seventh Congress and returned to Oklahoma City, where he continued the practice of law and his interest in the oil business.

He died in Oklahoma City, Oklahoma in 1950, and was interred in Fairlawn Cemetery.

References

External links
 
 Encyclopedia of Oklahoma History and Culture - Harreld, John
John W. Harreld Collection at the Carl Albert Center

1872 births
1950 deaths
People from Butler County, Kentucky
Republican Party members of the United States House of Representatives from Oklahoma
Republican Party United States senators from Oklahoma
National Normal University alumni
Bryant and Stratton College alumni